Uggi may refer to:

 Oghi, Pakistan, a town and tehsil in Pakistan
 Uggi, Jalandhar, a village in India

See also
 Uggie, a dog actor
 Ugi (disambiguation)